Tanna is a city in Thuringia, in the district of Saale-Orla-Kreis. It is located about 10 km south of Schleiz. Tanna was founded in 1495. The musicologist Paul Willert (1901–1988) was born in the city.

History
Within the German Empire (1871-1918), Tanna was part of the Principality of Reuss-Gera.

Population growth
Historical population (from 1994 December 31):

 Statistics since 1994: Thüringer Landesamt für Statistik

References

Saale-Orla-Kreis
Principality of Reuss-Gera